Olena Yanovska (Ukrainian: Олена Яновська; born 15 February 1990) is a Ukrainian athlete competing in the sprint hurdles. She represented her country at the 2016 Summer Olympics without advancing from the first round.

Her personal bests are 13.00 seconds in the 100 metres hurdles (+1.3 m/s, Almaty 2016) and 8.16 seconds in the 60 metres hurdles (Łódź 2015).

International competitions

References

1990 births
Living people
Ukrainian female hurdlers
Athletes (track and field) at the 2016 Summer Olympics
Olympic athletes of Ukraine